Helene Svedin (born 22 October 1974) is a Swedish model known as the face of H&M. She is married to former Portuguese footballer Luís Figo. They met in 1996 at a Joaquín Cortés show in Barcelona. They have three children together: Daniela (born 1999), Martina (born 2002) and Stella (born 2004). They live in Madrid, Spain.

Svedin has been in advertisements of Ana Sousa, Arena, Don Algodón, Friday's Project, Giorgio Armani, Guess?, Isdin, Kia Motors, Land Rover, L'Oréal, Luciano Padovan, Nike, Vista Alegre, and Schwarzkopf. She has appeared on the covers of GQ, Elle, Telva, Marie Claire, and Woman.

References

1976 births
Living people
Swedish female models
Association footballers' wives and girlfriends
People from Ångermanland